The State Anti-fascist Council for the National Liberation of Montenegro and Boka was formed as the highest governing institution of the anti-fascist resistance movement in Montenegro, in the former Kingdom of Yugoslavia.

The National Anti-Fascist Council of the Peoples Liberation of Montenegro and Boka was formed in Kolašin on 15 and 16 November 1943. On its second session on June 14, 1944 it changed its name to Montenegrin Anti-Fascist Assembly of National Liberation (CASNO).

During World War II it developed to be the leadership of the Socialist Republic of Montenegro. Its president was dr. Nikola "Niko" Miljanić.

In 1945 at the end of the war, it transformed to the National Parliament of Montenegro.

References

Montenegro in World War II
Anti-fascism in Montenegro
Bay of Kotor
Montenegro
Political history of Montenegro
1943 in Montenegro
1944 in Montenegro
1945 in Montenegro
1943 establishments in Montenegro
1945 disestablishments in Yugoslavia